Old gold is a dark yellow, which varies from light olive or olive brown to deep or strong yellow, generally on the darker side of this range.

The first recorded use of old gold as a color name in English was in the early 19th century (exact year uncertain).

In culture

Politics
Old gold is used as a political color by Mebyon Kernow, a Cornish nationalist party. The color is derived from Cornish kilts and tartans.

Sports
 Old gold is used for some NFL teams: the New Orleans Saints and the San Francisco 49ers. The reason for its use by the Saints is that New Orleans is an old city with the heritage and architecture of regal Europe. The reason for its use by the 49ers is the close identification of San Francisco (indeed the very choice of the mascot name) with the California Gold Rush of 1849.
 The home shirts worn by English football club Wolverhampton Wanderers F.C. are traditionally old gold in color.
 The primary colors of the University  of Missouri Tigers, Purdue University Boilermakers, the Wake Forest University Demon Deacons, and the DePauw University Tigers are old gold and black.
 The primary colors of the Georgia Tech Yellow Jackets are old gold and white.

See also 
 List of colors

References

External links
Academic Dress

Shades of yellow